Thomas William Boyle (29 January 1886 – 5 January 1940) was an English footballer, primarily associated with Burnley. He was the only player to have captained a Burnley team in a winning FA Cup Final.

Career
Boyle was  born in the village of Hoyland in Yorkshire in 1886. He started his career at Barnsley. In 1912 Boyle crossed the Pennines to sign for Burnley for what was then a club record fee of £1,150.

He was described as a great header of the ball, an excellent passer with great leadership qualities, and as being one of the best players ever to play for Burnley. Having lifted the FA Cup in 1914, he then became the first Burnley captain to lift the League Championship Trophy as Burnley won the 1920–21 title.

By then, he was 33 and his career was coming to an end. That season was to be his last full season in the first team. He made his last appearance for Burnley during the 1921–22 season, and after a further year playing in the reserves he signed for Wrexham, where he ended his playing career.

After his playing career, he had a spell coaching in Germany.

He won only one England cap against Ireland in Belfast in 1913. He also played in four representative matches for the Football League.

Personal life
Boyle served as a gunner in the Royal Field Artillery during the First World War and was wounded in 1917. After the war, Boyle worked as a landlord, but was committed to a psychiatric hospital in 1930. He died at Whittingham Hospital, Lancashire, ten years later, and was buried in an unmarked grave in Hoyland.

References

External links
England profile

English footballers
England international footballers
Barnsley F.C. players
Burnley F.C. players
Wrexham A.F.C. players
1886 births
1940 deaths
People from Hoyland
English Football League players
Association football wing halves
English Football League representative players
British Army personnel of World War I
Royal Field Artillery soldiers
FA Cup Final players